Lists of mathematicians cover notable mathematicians by nationality, ethnicity, religion, profession and other characteristics. Alphabetical lists are also available (see table to the right).

Lists by nationality, ethnicity or religion

 List of African-American mathematicians
 List of American mathematicians
 List of Bengali mathematicians
 List of Brazilian mathematicians
 List of Chinese mathematicians
 List of German mathematicians
 List of Greek mathematicians
 Timeline of ancient Greek mathematicians
 List of Hungarian mathematicians
 List of Indian mathematicians
 List of Italian mathematicians
 List of Iranian mathematicians
 List of Jewish American mathematicians
 List of Jewish mathematicians
 List of Norwegian mathematicians
 List of Muslim mathematicians
 List of Polish mathematicians
 List of Russian mathematicians
 List of Slovenian mathematicians
 List of Ukrainian mathematicians
 List of Turkish mathematicians
 List of Welsh mathematicians

Lists by profession

 List of actuaries
 List of game theorists
 List of geometers
 List of logicians
 List of mathematical probabilists
 List of statisticians
 List of quantitative analysts

Other lists of mathematicians

 List of amateur mathematicians
 List of mathematicians born in the 19th century
 List of centenarians (scientists and mathematicians)
 List of films about mathematicians
 List of women in mathematics

See also

 The Mathematics Genealogy Project – Database for the academic genealogy of mathematicians
 List of mathematical artists

External links
 The MacTutor History of Mathematics archive – Extensive list of detailed biographies
 The Oberwolfach Photo Collection – Photographs of mathematicians from all over the world
 Photos of mathematicians – Collection of photos of mathematicians (and computer scientists) made by Andrej Bauer.
 Famous Mathematicians
 Calendar of mathematicians' birthdays and death anniversaries

 
Lists of people in STEM fields